Teolinda Joaquina de Sousa Lança, better known as Linda de Suza, (22 February 1948 – 28 December 2022) was a Portuguese Lusophone and Francophone singer and best-selling author. She was described by Portuguese President Marcelo Rebelo de Sousa as "a French icon of Portuguese migration".

Early life
Linda de Suza was born in Beringel, Beja (Alentejo), in southern Portugal. Suza left her homeland, Portugal for France in the 1970s and started to work in menial jobs.

Career
In the late 1970s, she managed to record music albums. Her works such as Tiroli-Torola, La fille qui pleurait, Un Enfant peut faire le monde, and L'Étrangère drew a large audience in France. She topped her success with her performance at Paris Olympia.

Linda de Suza sang fado, folk, ballads and popular songs in both French and Portuguese and was nicknamed "Amália of France" after Amália Rodrigues, to whom she paid tribute in her song "Amália". Amália Rodrigues, known as "Rainha do Fado" ("Queen of Fado") paved the way for Linda de Suza, Tonicha, Lenita Gentil, Cândida Branca Flor, Dulce Pontes, Mariza and Mísia, among other well known Portuguese and Portuguese-descended singers.

In 1984, Linda de Suza published her autobiography La Valise en Carton ("The Cardboard Suitcase"). The book was also published the same year in Portugal, as A Mala de Cartão. Her book was followed by a number of novels. La Valise en carton was adapted into a cinema-film miniseries in 1988. All were successful.

Death
Linda de Suza died in France from complications of COVID-19 on 28 December 2022, aged 74.

Albums
1978: La fille qui pleurait / Un Portugais
1979: Amália / Lisboa
1980: Face à face
1981: Vous avez tout changé
1981: Em Português 
1982: L'Étrangère
1983: Comme vous
1984: La Chance
1984: Profil
1985: Rendez-le moi
1986: La Valise en carton: la comédie musicale
1989: Qu'est-ce que tu sais faire?
1991: Simplement vivre

Live albums
1983: A L'Olympia

Compilation albums
1980: 13+3
1981: Disque d'or (Un enfant peut faire chanter le monde)
1982: 13+3
1985: 13+3
1986: Super Look Compilation
1992: Linda de Suza: Ses plus belles chansons
1995: Best Of
1998: Linda de Suza (Best of, also including some unpublished songs)

and many others

Singles and tracks
Linda de Suza sang in Portuguese and French.
Some of her best-known songs (with chart positions in France wherever applicable):

References

External links
 
 
 Linda de Suza's musical albums on YouTube

1948 births
2022 deaths
People from Beja, Portugal
20th-century French women singers
20th-century Portuguese women singers
Portuguese emigrants to France
Deaths from the COVID-19 pandemic in France